Olanda Raynard Truitt (born January 4, 1971) is a former American football wide receiver in the National Football League for the Minnesota Vikings, Washington, and the Oakland Raiders.  He played college football at the University of Pittsburgh and Mississippi State University. Olanda was drafted in the fifth round of the 1993 NFL Draft by The Raiders, he was released prior to the regular season and signed on with Minnesota that same year. Truitt would return to play wide receiver and special teams for The Oakland 3 years later in 1996. Truitt tallied a total of 3 receiving touchdowns, during his NFL career.

References

1971 births
Living people
American football wide receivers
Minnesota Vikings players
Mississippi State Bulldogs football players
Oakland Raiders players
Pittsburgh Panthers football players
Category:Washington players
Sportspeople from Bessemer, Alabama
Players of American football from Alabama